Syria is a unitary state, but for administrative purposes, it is divided into fourteen governorates, also called provinces or counties in English  (Arabic muḥāfaẓāt, singular muḥāfaẓah). The governorates are divided into sixty-five districts (manāṭiq, singular minṭaqah), which are further divided into subdistricts (nawāḥī, singular nāḥiyah). The nawāḥī contain villages, which are the smallest administrative units.

Each governorate is headed by a governor, appointed by the president, subject to cabinet approval. The governor is responsible for administration, health, social services, education, tourism, public works, transportation, domestic trade, agriculture, industry, civil defense, and maintenance of law and order in the governorate. The minister of each local administration works closely with each governor to coordinate and supervise local development projects. The governor is assisted by a provincial council, all of whose members are popularly elected for four-year terms. In addition, each council elects from among its members an executive bureau which administers the day to day issues between provincial council sessions. Each executive officer is charged with specific functions.

Districts and subdistricts are administered by officials appointed by the governor. These officials work on local matters with elected district councils and serve as intermediaries between the central government and traditional local leaders, such as village chiefs, clan leaders, and councils of elders.

List

See also
List of governorates of Syria by Human Development Index
Districts of Syria
ISO 3166-2:SY
List of cities in Syria
List of towns and villages in Syria

References

 
Subdivisions of Syria
Syria, Governorates
Syria 1
Governorates, Syria
Syria geography-related lists
Syria politics-related lists
Syria